Culama is a genus of moths in the family Cossidae.

Species

australis species group
 Culama anthracica Kallies & D.J. Hilton, 2012
 Culama australis Walker, 1856 (= rhytiphorus Lower, 1893 and mesogeia Turner, 1932)
 Culama crepera Turner, 1939
 Culama dasythrix Turner, 1945
suffusca species group
 Culama alpina Kallies & D.J. Hilton, 2012
 Culama glauca Kallies & D.J. Hilton, 2012
 Culama suffusca Kallies & D.J. Hilton, 2012

Former species
 Culama caliginosa Walker, 1856
 Culama treicleiota Bethune-Baker, 1911

References

 , 2012: Revision of Cossinae and small Zeuzerinae from Australia (Lepidoptera: Cossidae). Zootaxa 3454: 1-62. Abstract: .
 , 2010: Taxonomic position of the genus Culama Walker, 1856 (Lepidoptera: Cossidae). Euroasian Entomological Journal, 9 (1): 101-102. Full article: .

External links
Natural History Museum Lepidoptera generic names catalog

Cossinae
Moth genera